(abbreviated Anime x Para or Ani x Para) is a series of animated short films produced by NHK to promote the 2020 Summer Paralympics in Tokyo. Each episode features a different Paralympic sport and is produced in collaboration with well-known anime and manga creators or franchises.

On February 28, 2020, it was announced that Kyoto Animation had to cancel an episode they were working on, originally due to be aired in August 2019, as due to an arson attack they would be unable to complete it in time for the 2020 Paralympics.

List of episodes

References

External links
 Official website (Japanese)
 Official website (English)
 YouTube playlist

2017 anime television series debuts
2020 Summer Paralympics
Sports anime and manga